Wolfgang Pepper (14 October 1910, Kiel – 12 October 1997, Berlin) was the mayor of Augsburg, Germany between 1964 and 1972. He was a member of the Social Democratic Party of Germany.

Mayors of Augsburg
Officers Crosses of the Order of Merit of the Federal Republic of Germany
1910 births
1997 deaths